The Corporación Nacional de Telecomunicaciones, CNT EP is the public telecommunications company in Ecuador that offers fixed telephony services local, regional and international, Internet Access (Dial-Up, DSL, mobile Internet), satellite television and mobile telephony in Ecuadorian territory.

It was founded on October 30, 2008 as a result of the merger of the now defunct Andinatel S.A. and Pacifictel S.A. On January 14, 2010 the CNT S.A. became a public company and was renamed the Corporación Nacional de Telecomunicaciones, CNT EP.
Subsequently, July 30, 2010 was the official merger of the Corporación Nacional de Telecomunicaciones, CNT EP with Alegro mobile phone company, allowing the company to enhance their product portfolio by focusing efforts in the packaging business and converged services technology.

External links
Official site
Telecomunicaciones in Ecuador website

References

Companies of Ecuador
Ecuadorian brands
Telecommunications companies established in 2008
2008 establishments in Ecuador